Perlini or Perlini Equipment SpA is an Italian off-road dump truck/lorry manufacturer.

Established in 1957 by Roberto Perlini, Perlini is based in San Bonifacio.

The company has two manufacturing facilities with a total area of 130.000 square meters in San Bonifacio and Gambellara.

History
Perlini started as an industrial vehicle transformation company in 1957. In 1961, it started directly producing dump trucks, still its main business today.
In the sixties, Perlini started selling a very large volume of dump trucks in the Chinese market, starting a very important commercial relationship, enduring through the years until the beginning of twenty-first century. Perlini trucks were employed in many large projects, including the construction of the Xiaolangdi Dam and Ertan dam.

In the late eighties, Perlini started participating in competitive races with its on-road dump trucks. The Perlini 105F "Red Tiger" has notably won the Dakar Rally four consecutive times, from 1990 to 1993.

In 2010, at the Bauma Construction Equipment fair, Perlini announced a partnership with Volvo Construction Equipment for distribution in the European market.

After the company went bankrupt in 2016, has been bought by Cangialeoni Group in 2018, now the new Industrie Macchine Perlini work in Gambellara and produce the latest rigid dumpers.

Products

Dump Trucks

Currently, Perlini produces dump trucks with a capacity from 30 to 95 metric tons, and it has sold over 12,000 units in the international market.
 DP 255
 DP 405 WD
 DP 605
 DP 705 WD
 DP 905
 DPT 70

Discontinued dump trucks

 DP205
 DP 366
 DP 655
 DP 755
 DP 855
 DP 955
 T20
 T40

All terrain vehicles

 Models 131 and 105 F - for Dakar Rally
 fire trucks
 AIS Perlini Baribbi crash tender using Perlini 605D chassis
 B502 4x4 Rosehbauer 
 quarry mining equipment

See also 

List of Italian companies

References

External links
 Perlini official website

Construction equipment manufacturers of Italy
Truck manufacturers of Italy
Vehicle manufacturing companies established in 1957
Italian companies established in 1957
Italian brands